Bernd Kannenberg (20 August 1942 – 13 January 2021) was a West German race walker who won the 50 km event at the 1972 Summer Olympics. He also competed in the 20 km at the 1972 and 1976 Games, but failed to finish. In 1972 Kannenberg became the first German athlete to walk 50 km within four hours; the same year he was awarded the Silbernes Lorbeerblatt. During his career he set five world records, and won six outdoor and four indoor West German titles.

Kannenberg was a professional soldier and trained at the sports school of the German Bundeswehr at Warendorf. After retiring from competitions, he coached the German race walking team.

Kannenberg was born in Königsberg (Eastern Prussia, from 1945, Kaliningrad). With his grandmother and cousin he was aboard the evacuation ship "Wilhelm Gustloff", when it was torpedoed by a Russian submarine. He and his cousin were among the est 9% survivors, while his grandmother died. In 1955, he emigrated with his family from Eastern Germany to West Germany.

References

External links 
 

1942 births
2021 deaths
Sportspeople from Königsberg
West German male racewalkers
Olympic gold medalists for West Germany
Athletes (track and field) at the 1972 Summer Olympics
Athletes (track and field) at the 1976 Summer Olympics
Olympic athletes of West Germany
World record setters in athletics (track and field)
European Athletics Championships medalists
Medalists at the 1972 Summer Olympics
Olympic gold medalists in athletics (track and field)
World Athletics Race Walking Team Championships winners
LAC Quelle Fürth athletes